Margaret B. Lettvin is an American writer and promoter of exercise and health. She was known in the Boston area in the 1970s for a PBS television show on WGBH-TV called Maggie and The Beautiful Machine, and a book based on the show. After a serious car accident, she developed a set of exercises for back pain, which became Maggie's Back Book.

She is the widow of MIT Professor Emeritus Jerome Lettvin, with whom she served as houseparent of the MIT Bexley dorm. They had three children: David, Ruth, and Jonathan.

Books

References

External links
Maggie Lettvin on Facebook

1927 births
American health educators
Living people